The Battle of Urmia (or, Urumiyeh) was fought near Lake Urmia in north-western Persia between the Safavid and Ottoman empires and resulted in a decisive Safavid victory. The Ottomans were fooled into an ambush by the Persian army where many of them were killed or captured in an encirclement manoeuvre. Over the next three years all of western and northern Persia was recaptured and the Safavids even re-established their suzerainty over their former vassals in the Caucasus.

Background 
In 1603, Shah Abbas I of Safavid Iran realised the vulnerability of the Ottoman Empire and undertook a campaign to regain the lost territories of his Empire. His attack in 1603 saw him easily defeating the Ottoman garrisons surrounding Tabriz, following up on the success and effectively punching the Ottoman armies back into a well-fortified Yerevan (The capital of modern Armenia) and Eastern Anatolia.

Battle 
Shah Abbas I approached with a force of an estimated 62,000 men, while the Ottomans held nearly  100,000 men. The Battle of Urmia, Urumiyeh or alternatively known as the Battle of Sis began with Allahverdi Khan's cavalry raid. The Ottoman commanders mistook this raid for the entirety of the Safavid offensive and turned about to give battle to them, leaving their flanks exposed. Seizing the opportunity, the Shah struck the Ottoman line with all the might of his hidden army, and sent a contingent to turn the remaining Ottomans defending the camp away. That Safavid contingent then turned about and sealed the remaining Ottoman units on the field in an encirclement, during which the entrapped Ottoman troops were either killed, injured or captured.  It is believed that the Ottomans suffered some 20,000 dead.

Aftermath 
With the only force capable of retaking Tabriz now disorderly and effectively routed, the Safavid offensive into the Caucasus was a success. After the defeat of Canbulatoğlu Hüseyin Pasha, Shah Abbas I liberated Ganja, Baku, Shamakhi and Shirvan.

References

Urmia
Urmia
Urmia 1604
History of West Azerbaijan Province
17th century in Iran